Semicassis thomsoni is a species of large predatory sea snail, a marine gastropod mollusc in the family Cassidae, the helmet shells and their allies.

Distribution
This marine species occurs in New Zealand. and in the Australian part of the Tasman Sea.

References

 Spencer, H.G., Marshall, B.A. & Willan, R.C. (2009). Checklist of New Zealand living Mollusca. Pp 196-219. in: Gordon, D.P. (ed.) New Zealand inventory of biodiversity. Volume one. Kingdom Animalia: Radiata, Lophotrochozoa, Deuterostomia. Canterbury University Press, Christchurch.

External links
 Brazier, J. (1876). Fourteen new species of terrestrial, fluvatile, and marine shells from Australia and the Solomon Islands. Proceedings of the Linnean Society of New South Wales. 1 (1): 1-9

Cassidae
Gastropods described in 1875